The 2005 Asian Cycling Championships took place at the Punjab Agricultural University's Velodrome, Ludhiana, India from 11 to 18 December 2005.

Medal summary

Road

Men

Women

Track

Men

Women

Medal table

References

External links
 www.cyclingnews.com

Asia
Asia
Cycling
Asian Cycling Championships
International cycle races hosted by India